Emery Thomas "E. T." Knudson (September 3, 1896 – June 13, 1974) was a justice of the Idaho Supreme Court from 1959 to 1965, serving as chief justice from 1963 to 1965. He received his LL.B. from the University of Idaho College of Law in 1921 and was a member of Kappa Sigma fraternity.

From northern Idaho, Knudson was born in Post Falls, graduated from Coeur d'Alene High School, and served overseas during World War I.

Knudson was elected to the court in 1959. In early 1965, he became the first elected official in Idaho to take a controversial loyalty oath enacted by the state legislature in 1963, and thereafter enjoined while awaiting litigation. Knudson resigned from the court later that year.

References

Justices of the Idaho Supreme Court
1896 births
1974 deaths